Thomas Emilio Poti (born March 22, 1977) is an American former professional ice hockey player. He played 14 seasons in the National Hockey League (NHL).

Playing career
As a youth, Poti played in the 1991 Quebec International Pee-Wee Hockey Tournament with a minor ice hockey team from Hartford, Connecticut.

He attended Saint Peter-Marian High School for two years. A graduate of the Cushing Academy, Poti moved on to play for Boston University of Hockey East. At BU in 1998, Poti became the first defenseman since Dave Archambault to win the Beanpot MVP. Poti was drafted in the third round of the 1996 NHL Entry Draft, 59th overall, by the Edmonton Oilers.

On March 19, 2002, the Rangers acquired Poti and Rem Murray in exchange for Mike York and a fourth round selection in the 2002 NHL Entry Draft. Poti was the point man on New York's top power-play unit until Fedor Tyutin took over. During his time with the Rangers, Poti became unpopular with his team's fans, to the point that he was booed at home whenever he touched the puck and cheered when he left the ice for a player change.

In the summer of 2006, Poti signed as a free agent with the Rangers' crosstown rival New York Islanders. For the rest of his career, he continued to hear choruses of boos when he touched the puck at Madison Square Garden.

On July 1, 2007, Poti signed a four-year deal with the Washington Capitals worth $3.5 million per year. Poti won his first playoff series with the Capitals when they eliminated the Rangers in seven games on April 28, 2009.

He signed a three-year contract extension with the Capitals in 2010. However, a recurring groin injury held him to only 21 games in 2010–11, and he did not play at all the following season. In September 2011, Washington General Manager George McPhee said that the injury has not improved and Poti's NHL career may be finished. However, after missing the entire 2011-12 season due to the groin issue, Poti was cleared to return upon the start of the lockout-shortened 2012–13 season. He was assigned to the Hershey Bears of the AHL on January 13, 2013 for a conditioning assignment, but was eventually called up to Washington, playing in 16 games. He became a free agent at the end of the season, and he announced his retirement on May 1, 2014.

Personal life
Poti resides in Sandwich, Massachusetts, with his wife Jessica and their two children. He suffers from severe food allergies. Contact with such foods as chocolate, peanuts, fish, Monosodium glutamate (MSG), and most spices and sauces can be potentially lethal. Poti carries an EpiPen epinephrine auto-injector at all times.

Despite growing up in Massachusetts, home of the Boston Red Sox, Poti is a fan of the New York Yankees.

After his retirement, Poti became a part-owner of the Boston Bandits junior ice hockey organization.

Career statistics

Regular season and playoffs

International

Awards and honors

References

External links 

Official Website

1977 births
American men's ice hockey defensemen
Boston University Terriers men's ice hockey players
Edmonton Oilers draft picks
Edmonton Oilers players
Hershey Bears players
Living people
National Hockey League All-Stars
New York Islanders players
New York Rangers players
Olympic silver medalists for the United States in ice hockey
Sportspeople from Barnstable County, Massachusetts
Washington Capitals players
Ice hockey people from Worcester, Massachusetts
Ice hockey players at the 2002 Winter Olympics
Medalists at the 2002 Winter Olympics
People from Sandwich, Massachusetts
AHCA Division I men's ice hockey All-Americans